Charles Winslade (21 November 1931 – 6 October 1993) was a Welsh rugby union and professional rugby league footballer who played in the 1940s, 1950s and 1960s.

Background
Charlie Winslade was born in Maesteg, Wales, and he died aged 61 in Maesteg, Wales.

Playing career

International honours
Charlie Winslade won caps for Wales (RL) while at Oldham and Warrington 1952…1963 6-caps, and won a cap for Great Britain (RL) while at Oldham in 1959 against France, and represented Other Nationalities (RL) while at Warrington, he played left-, i.e. number 11, in the 2-19 defeat by St. Helens at Knowsley Road, St. Helens on Wednesday 27 January 1965, to mark the switching-on of new floodlights.

Championship final appearances
Charlie Winslade played left-, i.e number 11, in Oldham's 3-7 defeat by Warrington in the 1954–55 Championship Final during the 1954–55 season on Saturday 14 May 1955, and played right-, i.e number 12, in the 15-14 victory over Hull F.C. in the 1956–57 Championship Final during the 1954–55 season at Odsal Stadium, Bradford on Saturday 18 May 1957.

County Cup Final appearances
Charlie Winslade played left-, i.e number 11, Oldham's 2-12 defeat by Barrow in the 1954–55 Lancashire County Cup Final during the 1954–55 season at Station Road, Swinton on Saturday 23 October 1954, and played right-, i.e number 12, in the 10-3 victory over St. Helens in the 1956–57 Lancashire County Cup Final during the 1956–57 season at Station Road, Swinton on Saturday 20 October 1956, played left- in the 13-8 victory over Wigan in the 1957–58 Lancashire County Cup Final during the 1957–58 season at Station Road, Swinton on Saturday 19 October 1957, played left- in the 12-2 victory over St. Helens in the 1958–59 Lancashire County Cup Final during the 1958–59 season at Station Road, Swinton on Saturday 25 October 1958, and played right-, i.e. number 10, in Warrington's 16-5 victory over Rochdale Hornets in the 1965–66 Lancashire County Cup Final during the 1965–66 season at Knowsley Road, St. Helens on Friday 29 October 1965.

Club career
Charlie Winslade changed rugby football codes from rugby union to rugby league when he transferred from Maesteg RFC to Oldham, he made his début for Oldham on Saturday 21 October 1950, and he played his last match for Oldham on Saturday 14 October 1961, he transferred from Oldham to Warrington, he made his début for Warrington on Saturday 18 November 1961, and he played his last match for Warrington on Monday 2 January 1967, and he transferred from Warrington to Leigh.

Testimonial match
Charlie Winslade's Testimonial match at Oldham took place during 1960.

Honoured in Oldham
Winslade Close in Oldham is named after Charles Winslade.
In book "Watersheddings Memories" a picture of Charles' granddaughters Charlotte Howell and Jaynee Winslade G. can be seen, they are both stood on "Winslade Close" next to the street sign.

References

 England & Wales, Birth/Death Indexes

External links
!Great Britain Statistics at englandrl.co.uk (statistics currently missing due to not having appeared for both Great Britain, and England)
Statistics at orl-heritagetrust.org.uk
Statistics at wolvesplayers.thisiswarrington.co.uk

1931 births
1993 deaths
Footballers who switched code
Great Britain national rugby league team players
Leigh Leopards players
Maesteg RFC players
Oldham R.L.F.C. players
Other Nationalities rugby league team players
Rugby league hookers
Rugby league locks
Rugby league players from Maesteg
Rugby league second-rows
Rugby union players from Maesteg
Wales national rugby league team players
Warrington Wolves players
Welsh rugby league players
Welsh rugby union players